Eburgemellus is a monotypic moth genus in the family Cossidae. Eburgemellus geminatus, the only species in the genus, is found in Cameroon and Ivory Coast.

References

Natural History Museum Lepidoptera generic names catalog

Zeuzerinae
Monotypic moth genera
Cossidae genera
Moths of Africa